Aqoura (also spelled Aaqoura, "Akoura") is a mountainous village in the Byblos District of  Keserwan-Jbeil Governorate, Lebanon. It is 68 kilometers north of Beirut. Aqoura has an average elevation of 1,600 meters above sea level and a total land area of around 10.5 square kilometers . Aqoura's inhabitants are  Maronite Catholics. 

By area, Aaqoura is the largest village belonging to its citizens (not emirate lands) in Lebanon.  By voting, it is the third largest town in the Byblos District, along with the district capital Byblos and Qartaba.

Maronites emerged from Aaqoura in the fourth century when Saint Maroun's disciple Ibrahim El Korchy started preaching and converting pagans to the Christian faith in the Aaqoura area. The carved stone Saint Peter and Paul church in Aaqoura is by far the oldest existing church in Lebanon and one of the oldest in the world. It was converted in the 4th century from a tomb place to the priests of the temple of Ashtarout in Afqa to a church.

The village of Aaqoura is known for the famous mountain chains surrounding and protecting it. These mountains have offered refuge for the citizens of Aaqoura during the different wars in Lebanon and the region. Also known for their courage, hospitality, and their intelligence the people of Aaqoura are studying and working worldwide. The local citizens work, value, and guard their lands. They cherish and proclaim their Christianity and play a major role in Lebanon through their political influence and their international relations.

References

Populated places in Byblos District
Maronite Christian communities in Lebanon